Baetoidea is a superfamily of mayflies, which probably includes the most primitive living species.

The following families are recognised:

Ameletopsidae
Ametropodidae
Baetidae
Oniscigastridae
Siphlonuridae

References

Mayflies
Insect superfamilies